was first a provisional railway station, then an actual train station located in Kotohira (琴平), Nakagawa, Hokkaidō, and was operated by the Hokkaidō Railway Company when it closed.

It was closed in 1990, and then at some point afterward, the station and all associated buildings were removed from the site.

Lines
Hokkaido Railway Company
Sōya Main Line

Adjacent stations

Railway stations in Hokkaido Prefecture
Defunct railway stations in Japan
Railway stations closed in 1990
Railway stations in Japan opened in 1955